{{DISPLAYTITLE:N-Methyl-L-glutamic acid}}

N-Methyl--glutamic acid (methylglutamate) is a chemical derivative of glutamic acid in which a methyl group has been added to the amino group.  It is an intermediate in methane metabolism.  Biosynthetically, it is produced from methylamine and glutamic acid by the enzyme methylamine—glutamate N-methyltransferase.  It can also be demethylated by methylglutamate dehydrogenase to regenerate glutamic acid.

References

Amino acid derivatives
Dicarboxylic acids
Secondary amino acids